This is a list of artists who are recording for or once recorded for Spinnin' Records and its sub-labels.



0–9
4 Strings

A

B

C

D

E
EDX
Nora En Pure
Ephwurd
Eptic

F
Sam Feldt
Felguk
Firebeatz
Sam Fischer
Sophie Francis
Shaun Frank
Funkin Matt

G
Garmiani
Martin Garrix
Cédric Gervais
Thomas Gold
Good Times Ahead
David Guetta

H
Hard Rock Sofa
Jay Hardway
Hardwell
Mike Hawkins
Headhunterz
Oliver Heldens
The Him
Hook N Sling

I
Iceleak
i_o

J
Felix Jaehn
Jauz
Julian Jordan

K
Kaskade
Alex Kenji
Dante Klein
Sander Kleinenberg
Mathieu Koss
Kris Kross Amsterdam
Kryder
Kshmr

L
Fedde le Grand
Lifelike
Lost Stories
Lucas & Steve
Lucky Charmes
Lvndscape

M

N
Matt Nash
Nervo

O
Öwnboss
Ummet Ozcan

P
Padé
Para One
Parkah & Durzo
Pep & Rash
Pickle
Anton Powers
Justin Prime
Promise Land

Q
Quintino

R
Rave & Crave
Nicky Romero
Chico Rose
Dave Ruthwell
Rune RK

S

T
Tchami
Throttle
Tiësto
TJR
David Tort
Timmy Trumpet
Tujamo
Tungevaag
Two Friends

V
Sander van Doorn
Armand van Helden
Vicetone
Vinai
Vintage Culture

W
Watermät
Wave Wave
Mike Williams
Wiwek

Y
Yultron
Yves V

Z
Zaeden
Zeds Dead
Ziggy
ZROQ

References

 
Spinnin' Records